
Year 18 BC was either a common year starting on Friday, Saturday or Sunday or a leap year starting on Saturday (link will display the full calendar) of the Julian calendar (the sources differ, see leap year error for further information) and a common year starting on Thursday of the Proleptic Julian calendar. At the time, it was known as the Year of the Consulship of Lentulus and Lentulus (or, less frequently, year 736 Ab urbe condita). The denomination 18 BC for this year has been used since the early medieval period, when the Anno Domini calendar era became the prevalent method in Europe for naming years.

Events

By place

Roman empire 
 Caesar Augustus introduces the Lex Julia (Julian Laws):
 Lex Iulia de Ambitu: Penalising bribery when acquiring political offices.
 Lex Iulia de Maritandis Ordinibus: Limiting marriage across social class boundaries.

Asia 
 Onjo becomes the first ruler of the Korean kingdom of Baekje (traditional date).

Births 
 Arminius, Chieftain of the Germanic Cherusci and a former officer (d. AD 21)

Deaths 
 Cornelia, daughter of Scribonia (second wife of Augustus)

References